Salvia carduacea, the thistle sage, is a herbaceous perennial shrub native to California and Baja California, found up to 1400 m elevation. It responds drastically to its environment, growing anywhere from 15 cm to 1 m in height. The wooly white basal leaves resemble a thistle's, with long spines, while the flowers grow in whorls on calyces that are wooly and spiny. The flowers are a vibrant lavender with bright orange anthers. The foliage is pungent, with a scent similar to citronella.

Notes

External links

 
 
 
 USDA Plants Profile
 Jepson manual

carduacea
Flora of Baja California
Flora of California
Plants described in 1833
Flora without expected TNC conservation status